Hattic may refer to:

 Hattians, an ancient people of Anatolia, Turkey
 Hattic language, an extinct language spoken in that region